The Steve Biko Football Club is a football club from Bakau in the West Africa state of Gambia, located near the capital of Banjul. They played in the GFA League First Division, which was the highest league in Gambian football. They won the GFA Cup in 2000. While the football club qualified for the 2002 CAF Cup, they declined to participate.

The Steve Biko Football Club was named after the murdered South African civil rights activist Steve Biko. Steve Biko was murdered by Apartheid regime government. Founded in 1978, the club initially began playing in the third division. They climbed the ranks of the league to achieve second place in 1983. In 1989, they played for the first time in the premier league.

Achievements 
Gambian Championnat National D1: 1
 2013.

Gambian Cup: 1
 2000.

Current players

Managers

 1999–2000 –  Jules Bocandé
  Abdoulie Bojang

References

External links 
Team profile – soccerway.com

Football clubs in the Gambia
1978 establishments in the Gambia